Colin Davies Rowe (12 April 1911 – 2 August 1970) was a lawyer and politician in South Australia. He served as 37th Attorney-General of South Australia from 1955 to 1965.

History
He studied law at the University of Adelaide, gaining his LLB in 1934, and was admitted to the bar in December 1934 at the same ceremony as Roma Mitchell. He worked as a lawyer at Ardrossan, then set up in practice at Maitland in 1942. He was chairman of the Maitland Hospital Board, secretary of the Yorke Peninsula Local Government Association, and secretary of the Ardrossan Hospital.

In 1948 he was president of the Yorke Peninsula branch of the Liberal and Country League, and in November 1948 was nominated by them, unopposed, to a Midland district seat in the Legislative Council made vacant by the death of Douglas Peel Gordon. He retained the seat until 1970.

Family
He married Elsie Dorothy Macklin of Brighton on 22 October 1938. They had at least two children:
son 7 January 1941
daughter 10 April 1947

References 

Members of the South Australian Legislative Council
1911 births
1970 deaths
20th-century Australian lawyers
Liberal and Country League politicians
20th-century Australian politicians
Attorneys-General of South Australia